Candiopella dukei is a species of snout moth in the genus Candiopella. It was described by Boris Balinsky in 1994 and is known from South Africa.

References

Endemic moths of South Africa
Moths described in 1994
Phycitinae